Bagheh-ye Shur Tappeh Nafas (also Romanized as Bāgh-e Shūr Tappeh Nafas; also known as Bāgh-e Shūr Tappeh) is a village in Katul Rural District, in the Central District of Aliabad County, Golestan Province, Iran. At the 2006 census, its population was 597, in 113 families.

References 

Populated places in Aliabad County